Kurt Gutenbrunner is a chef, cookbook author, and Austrian cuisine restaurateur in New York City.

References

External links

Wallsé, 344 W. 11th Street, New York, 1 Michelin star
Restaurants with Gallery-Grade Art Collections by Stephanie Murg, Gotham, February 27, 2014

Living people
Year of birth missing (living people)
Austrian chefs
Head chefs of Michelin starred restaurants
Cuisine of New York City